The Boland V-8 was an aircraft engine that was developed by the Boland Brothers for use in their tailless aircraft. The Boland motors all used an unusual concentric overhead valve. This arrangement positioned the intake valve in the middle of the exhaust valve. These were actuated by a single push rod and rocker arm.

Variants
60 HP
The prototype of this motor first appeared in a Boland aircraft 1908. According to a Boland advertisement from 1911, they claimed that this single original motor powered all of the various iterations of the early Boland aircraft for three years without the need for repair or rebuild
70 HP
Bore: , Stroke: , Displacement: , Weight: 
100 HP
Bore: , Stroke: , Displacement: , Weight: 
125 HP
This motor was mentioned in a 1914 Boland advertisement.

Applications
 Boland 1911 Tailless Biplane (60 HP)
 Shieder 1911 aeroplane (60 HP) 
 Boland 1911 Conventional Biplane (60 HP)
 Boland 1912 Tailless Biplane (60 HP)
 Spainour 1913 monoplane (60 HP)
 Boland 1914 Monoplane Flying Boat (70 HP)

Specifications (60 HP)

See also

References 

1910s aircraft piston engines